Tora Tora Tora is a special release EP by the Melvins, released in 1995 on X-Mas Records. It chronicles their trials and tribulations on some of their arena tours dealing with the fans of the larger bands they were touring with.

Track listing

Personnel 
as written in the package

Dale "Shakes" Crover - Drums, Backing Vocals, Gloves
Mark "Grumpy Cowboy" Deutrom - Electric Bass Guitar, Backing Vocals, Hats
King "Asshole Edward" Buzzo - Electric Guitar, Vocals, Dirty Clothes

References

1995 EPs
Melvins EPs